The mineral aggregate heliotrope, also known as bloodstone, is a cryptocrystalline mixture of quartz that occurs mostly as jasper (opaque) or sometimes as chalcedony (translucent).  The "classic" bloodstone is opaque green jasper with red inclusions of hematite. The red inclusions may resemble spots of blood, hence the name bloodstone.

The name heliotrope derives from various ancient notions about the manner in which the mineral reflects light. Such notions are described, for example, by Pliny the Elder (Nat. Hist. 37.165).

Legends and superstitions
Heliotrope was called "stone of Babylon" by Albertus Magnus and he referred to several magical properties, which were attributed to it from Late Antiquity. Pliny the Elder (1st century) mentioned first that the magicians used it as a stone of invisibility. Damigeron (4th century) wrote about its property to make rain, solar eclipse and its special virtue in divination and preserving health and youth.
A Christian tradition states that the red spots come from blood falling upon the stone during the crucifixion of Jesus, as he was stabbed in the side by a Roman soldier. Ancient Roman soldiers believed that the stone had the ability to slow bleeding and wore it for this reason. In India it is held that one can staunch the bleeding by placing upon wounds and injuries after dipping it in cold water, which may have a scientific basis in the fact that iron oxide, contained in the stone, is an effective astringent. The Gnostics wore the stone as an amulet for longevity, for wealth and courage, to strengthen the stomach, and to dispel melancholy. In the Middle Ages it was considered useful for animal husbandry. The ancient Greeks and Romans wore the stone to bring renown and favor, to bring endurance, and as a charm against the bite of venomous creatures. Greek and Roman athletes favored it as talisman for success in their games.

Sources
It has been found in Western Australia, Brazil, Bulgaria, Czech Republic, Italy, Nova Scotia, and numerous locations in the United States. There are also occurrences of bloodstone on the Isle of Rum, in Scotland.

References

 Hall, Candy A. (1994). Gem Stones. DK Publishing. .

External links
 

Chalcedony
Quartz gemstones